Dengzhou, formerly Deng County, is a city in Nanyang, Henan, China. The urban area is 35 km², and the urban population is 300,000. The city is located in the southwest of Henan province, adjacent to the borders between Henan, Hubei and Shaanxi. It geometrically lies in the center of the triangle of Zhengzhou, Wuhan and Xi'an, with equal distance to any of these three cities.

It is a city with a long cultural history in China. Historical figures from Dengzhou include Zhang Zhongjing (ancient Chinese medicine practitioner), Han Yu (poet), Kou Zhun (senator of Song dynasty), Fan Zhongyan (writer), Yao Xueyin (modern writer), and Zhou Daxin (modern writer).

Administrative divisions
As 2012, this city is divided to 3 subdistricts, 13 towns and 11 townships.
Subdistricts
Huazhou Subdistrict
Gucheng Subdistrict
Tuanhe Subdistrict

Towns

Townships

Climate

Economy
Dengzhou's economy is largely based on the production of agricultural products. Farmers grow crops such as wheat, cotton, maize, sesame, peanuts, yellow beans, peppers and tobacco.

The city's primary industries include cigarette-packing, food processing and sculpture.

Transport
Airplane to nearest Nanyang airport;
Drive along the National Expressway Network (Nanyang-Xiangfan link).
China National Highway 207
Railway by K149, K206/K207, K205/K208, K184, 6010/6011/6014, 1512/1513, 1389/1390, 1165/1168, 1126/1127.
Public bus transport: many

Tourism
Sightseeing

Lan Xiu Ting (Pavilion with picturesque view), Pagoda of Fu Sheng, relics of ancient city wall and the recently built touring area along the Tuan River.

Education
Dengzhou No.1 High School is the most popular high school of the city. Nanyang No.4 Teachers College is the only college of the city licensed to issue certified educational diplomas to students.

References

External links
Official website of Dengzhou government

 
Cities in Henan
County-level divisions of Henan
Nanyang, Henan